Trevor Birch (20 November 1933 – May 2013) was an English footballer who played as a wing half in the Football League for Aston Villa and Stockport County.

References

1933 births
2013 deaths
Sportspeople from West Bromwich
English footballers
Association football wing halves
Aston Villa F.C. players
Stockport County F.C. players
Nuneaton Borough F.C. players
English Football League players